Narbheram Hansraj Gujrati Middle School was established in 1924 to provide education to the children of the Gujrati community. In 1986 Mr. P. N Kamani started the English primary classes in the Gujrati school premises. In 1988 Mr. Nakul D Kamani took over as the School President and Chairman of the School Management Committee. He laid the foundation stone for the new building of the English medium school in 1989. The building, completed in 1991 was inaugurated by Dr. J. J Irani, Managing Director of Tata Steel in 1992. Mr. Nakul D Kamani is assisted by a committee of several eminent citizens of the town in guiding the school successfully on its quest for excellence in education.

Academics
Computer science is taught as a compulsory subject until grade nine, where students can choose to continue with it or to choose a different stream of subjects. The school is equipped with a lab for computer literacy and programming courses. The computer and basic science courses offered at the school include: GW-BASIC; Java (using the BlueJ IDE); and Logo. C++ is used as an optional course for the Plus Two students wishing to study computer science in college. The standard Chemistry, Physics and Biology courses are also offered as part of the science curriculum.

The arts and sciences offering at the school are: Mathematics (covering geometry, algebra and the calculus); English; Hindi, Sanskrit; Geography; Environmental Science; Home Economics; Political Science;  Commerce; Economics; and History.

As students move from 9th grade to 12th grade, they are allowed more freedom in choosing their own classes; they typically opt for a science or commerce related curriculum to facilitate their entrance into college and their success there.

Many students struggle with the I.C.S.E. exams, so the National Institute of Open Schooling (NIOS) was introduced. This is a program that allows weaker students to prepare for their examination and thus increases their chances of success.

See also
Education in India
Literacy in India
List of schools in India

References

External links

Narbheram Hansraj English School. 
High schools and secondary schools in Jharkhand
Education in Jamshedpur